West St. Paul is a city in Dakota County, Minnesota, United States. The population was 20,615 at the 2020 census. It is immediately south of Saint Paul and immediately west of South St. Paul.

History
The city's misleading name comes in part from the fact that it lies on the west bank of the predominantly north-to-south Mississippi River. A previous City of West St. Paul, incorporated in the late 19th century, was situated in what is now called Saint Paul's Lower West Side. According to the West 7th/Fort Road foundation, Saint Paul annexed the West Side, and was incorporated for two reasons: "to aid law enforcement—criminals could escape Saint Paul authorities by crossing to the West Side and Dakota County—and to eliminate the Wabasha Street Bridge tolls which were inhibiting development on the West Side." The current West St. Paul split from the western half of South St. Paul, and was incorporated in 1889, just south of the city of Saint Paul. The population was 20,615 at the 2020 census, growing by 1,075 since 2010. West Saint Paul is known for its 2.5-mile retail strip along Robert Street.

Geography

U.S. Highway 52 (also known as the Lafayette Freeway), Robert Street, and Minnesota Highway 62 are three of West St. Paul's main routes. Interstate Highway 494 runs just south of the city and Minnesota Highway 3 (unmarked Route 952) runs through the middle of the city and into downtown Saint Paul as Robert Street. Robert Street was named for Captain Louis Robert, a Mississippi River boat captain and early French-Canadian settler of Saint Paul.

Demographics

2010 census
As of the census of 2010, there were 19,540 people, 8,529 households, and 4,751 families living in the city. The racial makeup of the city was 78.0% White, 6.0% African American, 0.9% Native American, 2.2% Asian, 0.1% Pacific Islander, 8.6% from other races, and 4.3% from two or more races. Hispanic or Latino of any race were 19.5% of the population.

There were 8,529 households, of which 27.2% had children under the age of 18 living with them, 38.8% were married couples living together, 12.3% had a female householder with no husband present, 4.7% had a male householder with no wife present, and 44.3% were non-families. 37.6% of all households were made up of individuals, and 15.1% had someone living alone who was 65 years of age or older. The average household size was 2.25 and the average family size was 3.00.

The median age in the city was 39.7 years. 22.3% of residents were under the age of 18; 7.8% were between the ages of 18 and 24; 26.4% were from 25 to 44; 26.4% were from 45 to 64; and 17% were 65 years of age or older. The gender makeup of the city was 47.6% male and 52.4% female.

2000 census
As of the census of 2000, there were 19,405 people, 8,645 households, and 4,875 families living in the city. The racial makeup of the city was 87.27% White, 2.83% African American, 0.62% Native American, 1.89% Asian, 0.03% Pacific Islander, 4.88% from other races, and 2.49% from two or more races. Hispanic or Latino of any race were 9.98% of the population.

There were 8,645 households, of which 24.6% had children under the age of 18 living with them, 42.4% were married couples living together, 10.7% had a female householder with no husband present, and 43.6% were non-families. 37.1% of all households were made up of individuals, and 15.9% had someone living alone who was 65 years of age or older.  The average household size was 2.20 and the average family size was 2.93.

In the city, the population was spread out, with 21.1% under the age of 18, 8.9% from 18 to 24, 28.7% from 25 to 44, 22.1% from 45 to 64, and 19.2% who were 65 years of age or older.  The median age was 39 years. For every 100 females, there were 87.3 males.  For every 100 females age 18 and over, there were 83.1 males.

The median income for a household in the city was $41,103, and the median income for a family was $56,786. Males had a median income of $39,344 versus $29,836 for females. The per capita income for the city was $23,558.  About 3.8% of families and 5.9% of the population were below the poverty line, including 6.6% of those under age 18 and 5.2% of those age 65 or over.

Economy
West St. Paul's major employers include:

 TapeMark, a medical adhesives manufacturer (approx. 300 employees)
 Dakota County Government, the Northern Dakota County Service Center and Courthouse (approx. 500 employees)
 Independent School District 197 (approx. 300 employees)

Government
 Mayor: Dave Napier
 Council members: Dick Vitelli (Ward 1), Julie Eastman (Ward 1), Robyn Gulley (Ward 2), John Justen (Ward 2), Wendy Berry (Ward 3), Lisa Eng-Sarne (Ward 3).
 State Senator (Senate District 52): Matthew Klein
 State Representative (House District 52A): Richard J. Hansen
 County Commissioner (Commissioner District 2): Kathleen Gaylord

Police
The West St. Paul police department is made up of approximately 25 sworn officers, including four sergeants, 21 patrol officers and three part-time non-sworn Community Service Officers (CSO) under the command of Chief Brian Sturgeon.

Education
West St. Paul is served by Independent School District 197 public schools and is home to Moreland Arts and Sciences Magnet School (K-4), Garlough Environmental Magnet School (K-4), Heritage E-Stem Magnet School (grades 5-8), and Henry Sibley High School (grades 9-12).

Crown of Life Lutheran (K-8) and St. Croix Lutheran Academy High School (6-12) are two Christian schools of the Wisconsin Evangelical Lutheran Synod in West St. Paul.

The Thomas Irvine Dodge Nature Center's West St. Paul location contains nature preserves and a nature education-based preschool.

Notable people
 Tom Gibis, voice actor
 Karl F. Grittner, Minnesota state legislator and educator
 Raymond J. Kempe, Minnesota state representative and lawyer
 Joan Kroc, philanthropist and wife of McDonald's founder Ray Kroc
 Harold Stassen, former Minnesota governor, presidential candidate, statesman, and university president
 J. Robert Stassen, Minnesota state senator and businessman

References

External links
 City of West St. Paul – Official Website
 1881 History of West St. Paul

Cities in Minnesota
Cities in Dakota County, Minnesota